The Algeria national junior handball team is the national under–21 Handball team that represent Algeria in the international handball competitions and it is Controlled by the Algerian Handball Federation

History

World Championship record

African Championship record

Squad
2017 Men's Junior World Handball Championship
 Manager:  Rabah Gherbi
 Assistant coach:  Rachid Chikh
 Team Assistant:  Ahmed Djerana
 Physiotherapist:  MAHIOUT Belkacem
 Team Doctor :  Djamel Reggad

Legend
GK-Goalkeeper, LW-Left Winger, RW-Right Winger, LP-Line Player, BP-Back, LB-Left Back, CB-Center Back, RB-Right Back.

Notable players

Notable Coaches

References

External links
IHF profile

Handball in Algeria
Men's national junior handball teams
National sports teams of Algeria